Tristan Leyds (born 24 May 1997) is a South African rugby union player for the  in the Currie Cup. His regular position is wing or fullback.

Leyds was named in the  squad for the Super Rugby Unlocked campaign.

References

South African rugby union players
Living people
1997 births
People from Somerset West
Rugby union wings
Rugby union fullbacks
Western Province (rugby union) players
Stormers players
Rugby union players from the Western Cape